Bachia guianensis, the Guyana bachia, is a species of lizard in the family Gymnophthalmidae. It is found in    Venezuela and Colombia.

References

Bachia
Reptiles described in 1977
Taxa named by Marinus Steven Hoogmoed
Taxa named by James R. Dixon